Mohtarma Benazir Bhutto Shaheed Medical College MBBSMC is a medical college located in Mirpur, Azad Kashmir. It is a government-funded medical college and the selection is on the basis of merit. The college is recognized by the Medical Commission for 110 admissions.

Affiliated Teaching Hospitals
Teaching hospitals
New city Teaching Hospital Mirpur.

The DHQ Teaching Hospital along with KIC, is currently providing the practice facility for the students. It is a 300 bedded hospital with various departments.

Recognitions
The college is affiliated and recognized by following Organizations and Institutes :
Medical Commission
University of Health Sciences
International Medical Education Directory
College of Physicians and Surgeons
University of Azad Jammu and Kashmir

See also
 Azad Jammu Kashmir Medical College, Muzaffarabad 
 Poonch Medical College, Rawlakot
 University of Azad Jammu & Kashmir, Muzaffarabad
 Medical and Dental Council

References

Medical colleges in Azad Kashmir
Mirpur District
Educational institutions established in 2012
Memorials to Benazir Bhutto